Lauranne Dautais (born ) is a French female former volleyball player. She was part of the France women's national volleyball team.

She competed at the 2001 Women's European Volleyball Championship. On club level she played for RC de Cannes in 2001.

References

1973 births
Living people
French women's volleyball players
Sportspeople from Nantes